Bourbon Street is a historic street in the heart of the French Quarter of New Orleans. Extending thirteen blocks from Canal Street to Esplanade Avenue, Bourbon Street is famous for its many bars and strip clubs.

With 17.74 million visitors in 2017 alone, New Orleans depends on Bourbon Street as a main tourist attraction. Tourist numbers have been growing yearly after Hurricane Katrina in 2005, and the city has successfully rebuilt its tourist base. For millions of visitors each year, Bourbon Street provides a rich insight into New Orleans' past.

History of Bourbon Street and environs

1700 to 1880

The French claimed Louisiana in the 1690s, and Jean Baptiste Le Moyne de Bienville was appointed Director General in charge of developing a colony in the territory. He founded New Orleans in 1718. In 1721, the royal engineer Adrien de Pauger designed the city's street layout. He named the streets after French royal houses and Catholic saints. He paid homage to France's ruling family, the House of Bourbon, with the naming of Bourbon Street.

New Orleans was given to the Spanish in 1763 following the Seven Years' War. The Great New Orleans Fire of 1788 destroyed 80 percent of the city's buildings. The Spanish rebuilt many of the damaged structures, which are still standing today. For this reason, Bourbon Street and the French Quarter display more Spanish than French influence.

Following a brief restoration of French rule, the Americans gained control of the colony with the 1803 Louisiana Purchase. They translated the French street names into English, with Rue Bourbon becoming Bourbon Street.

During the 19th century, New Orleans was similar to other Southern cities in that its economy was based on selling cash crops, such as sugar and tobacco. By 1840, newcomers whose wealth came from these enterprises turned New Orleans into the third largest metropolis in the country. The city's port was the nation's second largest, with New York City being the largest.

The main difference between New Orleans and other Southern cities was its unique cultural heritage as a result of formerly having been a French and Spanish possession. Promoters emphasized this cultural legacy, in the form of its architecture, cuisine and traditions, to attract tourists to New Orleans.

1880 to 1960
The French Quarter was central to this image of cultural legacy and became the best-known part of the city. Recent arrivals in New Orleans criticized the perceived loose morals of the Creoles, a perception that drew many travelers to New Orleans to drink, gamble and visit the city's brothels, beginning in the 1880s.

Bourbon Street was a premier residential area prior to 1900. This changed in the late 1800s and early 1900s,, when the Storyville red-light district was constructed on Basin Street adjacent to the French Quarter. The area became known for prostitution, gambling and vaudeville acts. Jazz is said to have developed here, with artists such as King Oliver and Jelly Roll Morton providing musical entertainment at the brothels.

This was also the era when some of New Orleans' most famous restaurants were founded, including Galatoire's, located at 209 Bourbon Street. It was established by Jean Galatoire in 1905. Known for years by its characteristic line snaking down Bourbon Street, patrons waited for hours just to get a table — especially on Fridays.

Before World War II, the French Quarter was emerging as a major asset to the city's economy. While there was an interest in historic districts at the time, developers pressured to modernize the city. Simultaneously, with the wartime influx of people, property owners opened adult-centered nightclubs to capitalize on the city's risqué image. Wartime Bourbon Street was memorably depicted in Erle Stanley Gardner’s detective novel “Owls Don’t Blink”. After the war, Bourbon Street became the new Storyville in terms of reputation. By the 1940s and 1950s, nightclubs lined Bourbon Street. Over 50 different burlesque shows, striptease acts and exotic dancers could be found.

1960 to today

There was a move in the 1960s under District Attorney Jim Garrison to clean up Bourbon Street. In August 1962, two months after he was elected, Garrison began raiding adult entertainment establishments on Bourbon. His efforts mirrored those of his predecessors, which had been largely unsuccessful; however, he had more success. He forced closure on a dozen nightclubs convicted of prostitution and selling overpriced alcohol. Following this campaign, Bourbon Street was populated by peep shows and sidewalk beer stands.

When Mayor Moon Landrieu came into office in 1970, he focused his efforts on stimulating tourism. He did so by making Bourbon Street a pedestrian mall, making it more inviting. The 1980s and 1990s were characterized by a Disneyfication of Bourbon Street. Critics of the rapid increase of souvenir shops and corporate ventures said that Bourbon Street had become Creole Disneyland. They also argued that the street's authenticity had been lost in this process.

It was offered by the city of Namur (Belgium) to recall that the inventor of the instrument Adolphe Sax is from the region of Namur, specifically Dinant.

Impact of Hurricane Katrina

Given Bourbon Street's high-ground location in the French Quarter, it was mostly intact following 2005's Hurricane Katrina. A major tourist attraction, Bourbon Street renovation was given high priority after the storm. However, New Orleans was still experiencing a lack of visitors. In 2004, the year before Katrina, the city had 10.1 million visitors. The year after the storm, that number was 3.7 million.

One third of the city's operating budget, approximately $6 billion before Katrina, came from visitors and conventions, so officials saw tourism as vital for post-disaster economic recovery.

The New Orleans Tourism Marketing Corporation initiated efforts to draw visitors back to the city, featuring celebrities such as Emeril Lagasse and Patricia Clarkson with the slogan, "Come fall In love with Louisiana all over again." Travelers heard mixed messages in the media. Advertising campaigns gave the impression that New Orleans was thriving, while city leaders asked for increased federal financial assistance and National Guard troops to help control municipal crime waves.

New Orleans has been working its way back to pre-Katrina tourist numbers, as it attracted 9.5 million visitors in 2014 and 10.5 million visitors in 2016. The 2016 record was the highest since 2004.

For a time in April 2017, the 100 block of Bourbon Street was closed off for reconstruction of the street and its underground utilities as part of the city's $6 million French Quarter infrastructure project.

Entertainment, bars, and restaurants

Largely quiet during the day, Bourbon Street comes alive at night – particularly during the French Quarter's many festivals.  Most famous of these is the annual Mardi Gras celebration, when the streets teem with thousands of people.  Local open container laws allow drinking alcoholic beverages on the Quarter's streets. Popular drinks include the hurricane cocktail, the resurrection cocktail, the hand grenade and the so-called "huge-ass beers" – a large plastic cup of draft beer marketed to tourists at a low price.

The most heavily visited section of Bourbon Street is "upper Bourbon Street" toward Canal Street, an eight-block section of visitor attractions including bars, restaurants, souvenir shops and strip clubs. In the 21st century, Bourbon Street is the home of New Orleans Musical Legends Park, a free, outdoor venue for live jazz performances. The park has sculptures and other tributes to the city's legendary music personalities. Also home to Larry Flynts' Iconic flagship Hustler Club.

Most of the bars are located in the central section of Bourbon. Popular spots include Pat O'Brien's, Johnny White's, the Famous Door, Spirits on Bourbon, Channing Tatum's Saints and Sinners, Razzoo and The Cat's Meow. Marie Laveau's House of Voodoo is located on the corner of St. Ann Street.

The most renowned restaurant on Bourbon Street is Galatoire's; it represents traditional New Orleans dining and has a dress code. Lafitte's Blacksmith Shop and the Old Absinthe House are two of the many casual eateries. Also notable is the locals’ hangout, the Bourbon House.

"Lower Bourbon Street" (lower being a reference to downriver, or downstream Mississippi River), from the intersection of St. Ann Street, caters to New Orleans' thriving gay community. Featuring such establishments as Oz and the city's largest gay nightclub, the Bourbon Pub, St. Ann Street has been referred to as "the Velvet Line" or "the Lavender Line," the edge or approximate boundary of the French Quarter's gay community. Cafe-Lafitte-in-Exile is the oldest gay bar in the nation. The intersection of Bourbon and St. Ann Streets is also the center of the Labor Day weekend event Southern Decadence, commonly referred to as the Gay Mardi Gras, which attracts upwards of 100,000 participants.

Legal issues

Historically, noise violations were the responsibility of the individual making the noise. This changed in 1996 with Yokum v. 615 Bourbon Street, which ruled that the property owner, not the noise-maker, is responsible for noise violations. A 2010 city ordinance states that no music may be played in the French Quarter between 8 pm and 9 am. Enforcement has been inconsistent, and critics claim its goals are vague. Some even say that the local law is unconstitutional. Besides being difficult to enforce, music enthusiasts claim that noise ordinances threaten the city's notable music culture. Local jazz bands who play in the streets, such as the To Be Continued Brass Band, would be prohibited from doing so under such ordinances.

"Aggressive solicitation" bans are a more recent issue on Bourbon Street. In 2011, an ordinance was passed which prohibited individuals and groups from "disseminating any social, political or religious message" at night. The ordinance did not explain the justification for the rule.  On September 21, 2012, the ACLU of Louisiana won a temporary restraining order against the ban, on behalf of Kelsey McCauley (Bohn), a woman who converted to Christianity through a religious group's activities on Bourbon Street. The group had several of its members arrested, some of whom were cited on September 14, 2012, for violating the anti-solicitation ordinance.  A hearing was set for October 1, 2012.

On July 25, 2013, the New Orleans City Council voted 6-0 to amend the law and exempt Bourbon Street from the ban, with legal language found acceptable by the participating attorneys.

See also
 French Quarter
 French Market
 Jackson Square
 Royal Street
 Basin Street
 Canal Street
 Bourbon Street Hotel and Casino

References

External links

 Bourbon Street on neworleans.com
 Bourbon Street on frenchquarter.com

Streets in New Orleans
French Quarter
Economy of New Orleans
Entertainment districts in the United States
Tourist attractions in New Orleans